The 1999 Qatar Open, known as the 1999 Qatar Mobil Open, for sponsorship reasons,  was a men's tennis tournament held in Doha, Qatar and part of the World Series of the 1999 ATP Tour. It was the seventh edition of the tournament and was played on hard court and was held from 4 January through 11 January 1999. Unseeded Rainer Schüttler, who entered the draw as a qualifier, won the singles title.

Finals

Singles

 Rainer Schüttler defeated  Tim Henman, 6–4, 5–7, 6–1
 It was Schüttler's first singles title of the career.

Doubles

 Alex O'Brien /  Jared Palmer defeated  Piet Norval /  Kevin Ullyett, 6–3, 6–4

References

 
Qatar Open
Qatar Open (tennis)
1999 in Qatari sport